The Pamparomas District is one of 10 districts of the Huaylas Province in the Ancash Region of Peru. The capital of the district is the village of Pamparomas. The district was founded on January 2, 1857.

Location
The district is located in the south-western part of the province at an elevation of 2,862m in the Cordillera Negra (Spanish for black mountain range). The capital of the province, Caraz, is located at a distance of 80 km. The nearest large city is Chimbote, located on the pacific coast at a distance of 140 km from Pamparomas.

Geography 
Other mountains are listed below:

Political division
The district is divided into 43 hamlets:

Ethnic groups 
The people in the district are mainly indigenous citizens of Quechua descent. Quechua is the language which the majority of the population (81.62%) learnt to speak in childhood, 18.19% of the residents started speaking using the Spanish language (2007 Peru Census).

References

External links
  Official website of the Pamparomas District

1857 establishments in Peru
Districts of the Huaylas Province
Districts of the Ancash Region